Albrecht Erb (1628–1714) was a notable Austrian clockmaker, active in Vienna, and a member of that city's council.

Erb worked primarily for Austria's court and municipalities, but he also received numerous orders from abroad, and was particularly known for his astronomical clocks. One of his principal works is owned by the Kunsthistorisches Museum in Vienna.

References 
 Allgemeine Deutsche Biographie entry (German WikiSource)
 Watch-wiki entry

Austrian clockmakers
1628 births
1714 deaths